Last Duel may refer to:

The Last Duel (1981 film), Taiwanese martial arts drama; original title 英雄對英雄
Last Duel (video game), 1988 Japanese vertical scrolling shooter by Capcom
The Last Duel: A True Story of Crime, Scandal, and Trial by Combat in Medieval France, 2004 book by American medievalist Eric Jager
Pushkin: The Last Duel (2006 film), Russian drama about Pushkin's death
The Last Duel, 2010 French short film about the last duel in England, aka Le Dernier Duel
The Last Duel (2021 film), British-American historical drama based on Jager's 2004 book